Volha Viktarauna Khilko (Łacinka: Volha Viktaraŭna Chilko; born March 24, 1979 in Babruysk) is an amateur Belarusian wrestler, who competed in the women's middleweight category. She is the 2005 World bronze medalist and European silver medalist.

Career 
Khilko won the bronze medal at the 2005 World Wrestling Championships in Budapest, Hungary, in addition to her silver at the European Championships in Varna, Bulgaria.

Khilko made her official debut at the 2004 Summer Olympics, where she placed second in the preliminary pool of the women's 63 kg class, against France's Lise Legrand and Tajikistan's Natalia Ivanova. Khilko, however, lost to Canada's Viola Yanik in the fifth place match, with a technical score of 2–5.

At the 2008 Summer Olympics in Beijing, Khilko lost the second preliminary match of the 63 kg class to Poland's Monika Michalik by a technical fall, finishing in 13th place.

References

External links
FILA Profile
NBC 2008 Olympics profile

Belarusian female sport wrestlers
1979 births
Living people
Olympic wrestlers of Belarus
Wrestlers at the 2004 Summer Olympics
Wrestlers at the 2008 Summer Olympics
People from Babruysk
World Wrestling Championships medalists
Universiade medalists in wrestling
Universiade silver medalists for Belarus
Medalists at the 2005 Summer Universiade
Sportspeople from Mogilev Region
20th-century Belarusian women
21st-century Belarusian women